Lê Thanh Bình (born 8 August 1995) is a Vietnamese footballer who plays as a forward for Bình Định.

International goals

Honours

International

Vietnam U23
 Third place : Southeast Asian Games: 2015

References

External links 
 
 Home page VPF

1995 births
Living people
Vietnamese footballers
Association football forwards
V.League 1 players
Thanh Hóa FC players
People from Thanh Hóa province
Southeast Asian Games bronze medalists for Vietnam
Southeast Asian Games medalists in football
Competitors at the 2015 Southeast Asian Games
Competitors at the 2017 Southeast Asian Games